The Ole Miss–Tulane football rivalry is an American college football rivalry between the Ole Miss Rebels and Tulane Green Wave. The rivalry began in 1893. Ole Miss leads the series 42–29. It is Tulane's second-oldest football rivalry, one week younger than the Battle for the Rag. It is Ole Miss' oldest rivalry, predating its rivalries with Alabama, LSU (Magnolia Bowl), and Vanderbilt by a year, and Tulane is Ole Miss' most-played opponent not currently in the Southeastern Conference (SEC).

Series history
The first game took place on December 2, 1893, in New Orleans, and the two schools have continued to play each other with few interruptions since. Tulane and Ole Miss spent much of their athletic histories as members of the same conference: the SIAA from 1899 to 1920, the Southern Conference from 1922 to 1932, and as charter members of the SEC from 1932 to 1966. Ole Miss did not play a game against Tulane at home in Oxford, Mississippi, until 1920, and it wasn't until 1951 that the teams began to frequently alternate hosting the game.

The Ole Miss–Tulane game on November 30, 1974, was the last collegiate football game played in Tulane Stadium, and the game on September 20, 1975, was the first collegiate game played in the Louisiana Superdome. Tulane is now a member of the American Athletic Conference, while Ole Miss remains in the SEC. The next game in the series is scheduled for 2023 in New Orleans.

Game results

See also  
 List of NCAA college football rivalry games

References

College football rivalries in the United States
Ole Miss Rebels football
Tulane Green Wave football